Sharina Cantre Gutierrez is an American model.

Early life and career 
Gutierrez was born in Los Angeles to Filipino parents. She was raised in Riverside, California. At 13, she was discovered at a modeling competition in New York City, and her first job was for Vogue Italia. Gutierrez has also appeared in Teen Vogue, Glamour, Elle, and (the now-defunct) Lucky. Gutierrez has modeled for brands such as United Colors of Benetton, Levi’s, Rimmel London, Band of Outsiders, 3.1 Phillip Lim, Polo Ralph Lauren, and Tommy Hilfiger. She appeared in a Reebok campaign alongside Ariana Grande, Gigi Hadid, Rae Sremmurd, Teyana Taylor and Lil Yachty.

She has appeared in music videos for Chris Brown and Tyga.

Personal life 
Gutierrez has a son and a daughter.

References 

Living people
1990 births
People from Los Angeles
American models of Filipino descent
Female models from California
People from Riverside, California
21st-century American women